Brian Scott Frons  (born June 15, 1956) is an American television executive and the former president of ABC Daytime.

Education
Frons earned a master’s degree from Syracuse University's S. I. Newhouse School of Public Communications in 1978.

CBS and NBC
Brian Frons first worked at CBS Daytime from 1978 to 1983.

He left CBS in 1983 to join NBC Daytime, where he stayed during the rest of the 1980s as vice president. In 1986, he canceled Search for Tomorrow which was at the time the longest running soap opera in television, but also the lowest-rated program among the 14 daytime soap operas on the air that year.
 Frons gained media attention in 1989 when he made a guest appearance in an episode of Santa Barbara, playing the role of God in a dream of character Mason Capwell (Lane Davies).

During his time at NBC, Frons also introduced Generations, the first soap opera to feature an African-American family from its inception. He cited:
"I just didn't see the point of another soap about the same types of people. It didn't take a rocket scientist to see that a lot of shows on in prime time several years ago did not deal with older people. So Brandon (Tartikoff) gave us Golden Girls. Well, the same thing goes for daytime now. You don't see many black characters. And blacks certainly watch daytime TV. So this decision wasn't exactly a brainer. It was just about time."

ABC
Frons joined ABC Daytime in August 2002. In May 2006, Anne Sweeney, the head of Disney-ABC Television Group, named Frons the president of the newly created Daytime, Disney-ABC Television Group.

In his capacity as president of ABC Daytime, Frons was responsible for the development, marketing, production and promotion of all ABC Daytime properties, which have included The View, Port Charles, All My Children, One Life to Live, General Hospital, The Chew, and The Revolution. In his new position, Frons took on the additional duties of overseeing SOAPnet and ABC Productions. During his tenure,  soap operas General Hospital and All My Children switched to high-definition taping.
Frons was also instrumental in the launch of the Soap Opera Digest Awards.

Cancellation of Port Charles
In June 2003, Frons announced the cancellation of the ABC soap opera Port Charles (which was a spinoff of General Hospital) after six years because of low ratings. He quoted that the decision to cancel the show "was an extremely difficult decision" and that the network was "pleased with the creative execution of the show, but the 30 minute format in this time period posed significant financial challenges". since the staff of the program only worked for six months out of the year, the remaining episodes were aired with the cast not taping resolutions to existing storylines. The show's 12:30 p.m. EDT timeslot was returned to ABC's affiliates on October 6, 2003. Shortly after the cancellation was announced, several ABC affiliates, including New York network flagship WABC-TV, reached a deal with Buena Vista Television to carry Millionaire, which had moved from primetime to broadcast syndication one year earlier. As Millionaire'''s second syndicated season premiered before Port Charles aired its last episode, a few stations did not air the last few weeks of the soap in its normal timeslot. 

 Cancellation of All My Children and One Life to Live 

On April 14, 2011, Frons announced the cancellation of ABC soap operas All My Children and One Life to Live. While he made the announcement in person to the All My Children cast and crew in Los Angeles, the New York-based One Life to Live was tuned in through a video link. All My Children ended its run on the network on September 23, 2011, while One Life to Live concluded on January 13, 2012. As a result of the cancellations, Frons was the subject of widespread criticism. He was labeled as the most hated man among soap opera fans, with online petitions being made for his firing from ABC Daytime.

In response to the decision to cancel All My Children and One Life to Live, Frons said:

 "You can't cut costs enough to make up for those losses. There comes a point when you can no longer justify the expense. Soap operas are an expensive way to program a network and unless you have General Hospital or The Young and the Restless sized ratings, it's really not a business."One Life to Live eventually surpassed on a consistent basis the ratings of General Hospital starting the week of April 25, 2011 in total number of viewers, and the week of October 24, 2011 in the 18-49 women key demographic. In both cases,  One Life to Live  remained, from then on, ABC's highest-rated soap opera for the rest of its run.

In place of All My Children and One Life to Live, Frons green-lighted two new talk shows, The Chew and The Revolution, respectively. In expressing his rationale for the cancellations, he stated:

 "I wanted to do shows that were unusual for daytime. What's happening now is people are looking for information to make their lives better, they're obsessed about what they eat and they’re obsessed with weight."

Actress Susan Lucci stated in her book All My Life that she was misled to believe that the rumors of the cancellation were untrue. According to Lucci,  Frons told the cast and crew in December 2009 that in order to save All My Children, it was vital that the show relocate to Los Angeles from New York, with all players taking pay cuts. Many left friends and family and sold or rented their East Coast homes in a downward market, resulting in great economic loss. Lucci also mentioned that just before the announcement of the cancellations, Dominick Nuzzi, senior vice president of production for ABC Daytime, congratulated the cast, crew, and production staff of All My Children for doing so well financially, stating that the show's production costs were down 25 percent from the previous year and "things [were] going great." In addition to the statement from Nuzzi, the show was given a budget to support upcoming storylines, and Lorraine Broderick was given a new multi-year contract as head writer of All My Children.

Lucci blamed both Frons and former head writer Chuck Pratt for the demise of All My Children, stating: 
"Brian Frons has what, for me, is that fatal combination of ignorance and arrogance."

Departure
On December 2, 2011, ABC Disney announced that Frons would be leaving the company effective January 2012. This announcement came the day after Frons terminated General Hospital executive producer Jill Farren Phelps and demoted head writer Garin Wolf.

Frons was replaced by Vicki Dummer, who has been with ABC since 1996.
The corporate structure that Frons was running has been dismantled with ABC Daytime going to newly created Times Square Studios headed by Dummer, while SOAPnet was transferred to ABC Family.

 Broadcasting career 
 Senior vice president (London-based SBS Broadcasting, S.A.)
 President, Creative Affairs (New World Entertainment)
 Vice president, Creative Affairs, NBC Productions
 Vice president of NBC Entertainment
 Director, Daytime Programming, CBS Entertainment
 Creative Consultant of All My Children and One Life to Live Head Writer (with Frank Valentini) of One Life to Live (November 29, 2004 to December 10, 2004)
 Story Consultant of General Hospital Head Writer (with Julie Hanan Carruthers) of All My Children (mid-January 2008 to January 30, 2008)

 Personal life 
Frons is married to Jeanine Guarneri-Frons, a former director on NBC soap opera Santa Barbara'', and they reside in Encino, California.

References

External links
ABC Daytime
Broadcasting & Cable 2007 Interview
Pepperdine University Interview

ABC Daytime executives
CBS Daytime executives
NBC Daytime executives
American Broadcasting Company executives
American soap opera writers
American television executives
Living people
Soap opera producers
1956 births
S.I. Newhouse School of Public Communications alumni
Screenwriters from New York (state)